American Records, America Records or American record may refer to:

 America Records (France), French jazz label
 American Record Company (1904–06), an American record label from 1904 to 1906
 American Record Corporation, or ARC (from 1929)
 American Recordings (record label), formerly known as Def American Recordings
 America discography, of the band named America